Megargee is a surname. Notable people with the surname include:

Edwin Megargee (1883–1958), American painter, illustrator, and author
Geoffrey P. Megargee (1959–2020), American historian
Lon Megargee (1883–1960), American painter, cousin of Edwin